Tuscola Airport  is a privately owned public use airport located two nautical miles (3.7 km) southwest of the central business district of Tuscola, a city in Douglas County, Illinois, United States.

The airport is a major base for crop-dusting aircraft in the area to support farms growing corn, soybeans, and other crops. The airport is home to an Illinois branck of Atlantic Ag Aviation. The airport received an EPA-approved chemical loading site in 2010 after being bought by its current owner.

Facilities and aircraft 
It has one runway designated 9/27 with a gravel surface measuring 2,660 by 30 feet (811 x 9 m).

For the 12-month period ending January 31, 2019, the airport had 8,700 aircraft operations, an average of 23 per day: 98% general aviation and 2% air taxi. At that time there were 12 aircraft based at this airport: 58% single-engine and 42% ultralight.

References

External links 
 Aerial image as of 27 March 1999 from USGS The National Map

Airports in Illinois
Buildings and structures in Douglas County, Illinois